The wilderness areas of Finland are remote areas which are not strictly nature reserves. The areas were set up in 1991 to preserve their wilderness character, the Sami culture and their natural form of livelihood. There are 12 such areas, all of which are located in northern Lapland. All the reserves are managed by the Metsähallitus (Forest Administration).

 Hammastunturi Wilderness Area
 Kaldoaivi Wilderness Area
 Kemihaara Wilderness Area
 Käsivarsi Wilderness Area
 Muotkatunturi Wilderness Area
 Paistunturi Wilderness Area
 Pulju Wilderness Area
 Pöyrisjärvi Wilderness Area
 Tarvantovaara Wilderness Area
 Tsarmitunturi Wilderness Area
 Tuntsa Wilderness Area
 Vätsäri Wilderness Area

See also
 Protected areas of Finland

References

External links
Wilderness areas of Finland
National parks, hiking areas, wilderness areas

 
Protected areas established in 1991
1991 establishments in Finland